Sam Lampkin was an American Negro league catcher in the 1900s.

Lampkin played for the San Antonio Black Bronchos in 1907 and 1908. In nine recorded games, he posted ten hits in 32 plate appearances.

References

External links
Baseball statistics and player information from Baseball-Reference Black Baseball Stats and Seamheads

Year of birth missing
Year of death missing
Place of birth missing
Place of death missing
San Antonio Black Bronchos players